Opus 12 is the twelfth studio album by Taiwanese singer Jay Chou, released on 28 December 2012 by JVR Music.

The album was nominated for four Golden Melody Awards.

Track listing

Awards

References

External links
  Jay Chou discography@JVR Music

2012 albums
Jay Chou albums
Sony Music Taiwan albums